Guineans in France consist of migrants from Guinea and their descendants living and working in France.

History                                
During the 1960s, Black Africans began to immigrate to France in large numbers. These immigrants mostly came from the Senegal Valley (Senegal, Mali, Mauritania, Guinea) and were composed mainly of male workers.
By the 1970s, the population of Guineans in France had more than doubled due to immigration laws permitting family reunifications.  The growth of this population slowed significantly during the 1990s, but has increased in the 21st century, with immigrants now increasingly settling outside the Île-de-France in cities like Lyon or Marseille.

Notable people                       

 Black M, rapper
 Paul Pogba, footballer
 MHD, rapper
 Diaryatou Bah, activist

References               

African diaspora in France
Society of France
 
Guinean diaspora
Immigration to France by country of origin